Hana Andronikova (9 September 1967 – 20 December 2011) was a Czech writer.

Andronikova was born in Zlín.  After attending high school in Zlín, she studied English and Czech at the Faculty of Arts of the Charles University in Prague. Both her novels, Zvuk slunečních hodin and Nebe nemá dno, were awarded the Magnesia Litera book award in 2002 and 2011 (different categories). She also wrote short stories and dramas. She died of cancer.

See also
 List of Czech writers

References

External links
 Hana Andronikova's profile in the online Lexicon of Czech Literature after 1945
 Author profile in English on czechlit.cz

1967 births
2011 deaths
Czech women writers
Writers from Zlín
Deaths from cancer in the Czech Republic
International Writing Program alumni
Charles University alumni